DDD or Triple D may refer to:

Science and medicine
Defined daily dose, a World Health Organization statistical measure of drug use
Degenerative disc disease, a common disorder of the lower spine
Dense deposit disease, the preferred name for Membranoproliferative glomerulonephritis Type II
Dichlorodiphenyldichloroethane, a breakdown product of DDT
Dual pacing, dual sensing and dual response modes of a pacemaker

Computers and technology
Data Display Debugger or GNU DDD, a popular graphical user interface for command-line debuggers
Digital Divide Data, a social enterprise providing disadvantaged youths in Cambodia, Laos and Kenya with IT education and training
Direct distance dialing, a method for telephone subscribers to call long-distance numbers without operator assistance
DDD, the SPARS code for a CD that was recorded, mixed, and mastered digitally
Domain-driven design, a methodology and set of priorities for programming
Developer! Developer! Developer!, a series of community conferences for software developers
3D Systems (DDD), a company that makes devices for stereolithography or 3D printing

Entertainment and popular culture

Music
DDD (album), a 2000 album by Poster Children named after the pure digital SPARS code
"DDD" (Koda Kumi song), 2005
"DDD" (EXID song), 2017

Television
Diners, Drive-Ins and Dives, an American food television series

Organizations
Delta Delta Delta, a national collegiate sorority
Denali Destroyer Dolls, roller derby league based in Wasilla, Alaska

Other uses
Dictionary of Deities and Demons in the Bible, an academic reference work
DDD, a brassiere cup size
Destroy Dick December, a joke Internet challenge
Die-deterioration doubling, a minting error on coins
Direct digital democracy
Dongotono language, a language of Southern Sudan
Doe Triple-D tractor
Dhaalu Airport, Dhaalu Atoll, Maldives (IATA code DDD)
The first "Three D's" of pruning: Damaged, Diseased and Dead

See also
 King Dedede, fictional character in Nintendo's Kirby video-game series
 3D (disambiguation)
 D3 (disambiguation)
DDDD, the four D's of pruning

Science disambiguation pages
Technology and engineering disambiguation pages